The 1929 The Citadel Bulldogs football team represented The Citadel, The Military College of South Carolina as member of the Southern Intercollegiate Athletic Association (SIAA) in the 1929 college football season. Carl Prause served as head coach for the eighth season. The Bulldogs played home games at Johnson Hagood Stadium.

Schedule

References

Citadel
The Citadel Bulldogs football seasons
Citadel Bulldogs football